Gurjars or Gujjars are divided in number of clans (Gotras).They have as many as 1178 gotras.

B 

Bainsla
 Bhati
Bhadana clan

T 
 Tanwar

References 

Gurjar clans
Gotras